The Annie Award for Storyboarding in an Animated Television/Broadcast Production is an Annie Award given annually to the best storyboarding in animated television or broadcasting productions. It was first presented at the 25th Annie Awards.

Winners and nominees

1990s

2000s

2010s

2020s

References

External links 
 Annie Awards: Legacy

Annie Awards